Lebedyan is a town and the administrative center of Lebedyansky District in Lipetsk Oblast, Russia, located on the upper Don River,  northwest of Lipetsk, the administrative center of the oblast. Population:

History
It was founded in 1613 largely to guard the holdings of I. N. Romanov, the Tsar's uncle, and served as a border outpost protecting South Russia from the Crimean Tatars' incursions. The Trinity Monastery was established in 1621 and several churches were built by the end of the century; they are all now reduced to ruins.

Chartered in 1779, Lebedyan developed in the 19th century as a center of horse racing and horse breeding. The locals claim that the first racetrack in Russia was opened here in 1826. The Agricultural Society of Lebedyan, founded in 1847, was influential in preparing the emancipation reform of 1861.

In 1984 construction of an underground metro began as hobby tunneling. However this was abandoned in 2010 without having opened.

Administrative and municipal status
Within the framework of administrative divisions, Lebedyan serves as the administrative center of Lebedyansky District. As an administrative division, it is incorporated within Lebedyansky District as Lebedyan Town Under District Jurisdiction. As a municipal division, Lebedyan Town Under District Jurisdiction is incorporated within Lebedyansky Municipal District as Lebedyan Urban Settlement.

Economy
The town is the location of the largest fruit juice manufacturer in Eastern Europe, Lebedyansky.

Architecture

Lebedyan has two cathedrals, both dedicated to the icon of the Theotokos of Kazan. The old and neglected cathedral goes back to the 18th century, while the larger cathedral on the market square was designed in the Empire style and consecrated in 1839.

Notable people
Lebedyan is the birthplace of Yevgeny Zamyatin. Other residents of the town include Mikhail Bulgakov and Andrey Bely. Ivan Turgenev incorporated a story titled Lebedyan in his collection A Sportsman's Sketches. It was also the home of Leonid Mulyarchik, who attempted to singlehandedly build a subway system in the town. (He eventually gave up on the project.)

References

Notes

Sources

Cities and towns in Lipetsk Oblast
Lebedyansky Uyezd
Populated places established in 1613
1613 establishments in Russia